× Galeansellia, abbreviated in trade journals Gslla, is an intergeneric hybrid between the orchid genera Ansellia and Galeandra (Aslla × Gal).

References 

Orchid nothogenera
Cymbidieae